Hits On Fire is the first ever Bryan Adams compilation album, released exclusively for Japan in 1988. Disc 1 is actually Bryan Adams' 1987 album Into the Fire, released on March 30, 1987, through A&M Records.

Disc 2 features hit singles from the albums Cuts Like a Knife and Reckless, with the addition of three songs from 12" singles issued in 1985. These were not issued on CD outside Japan.

Track listing
CD 1:

CD 2:

Personnel
 Bryan Adams - guitar, piano, keyboards, vocals
 Keith Scott - lead guitar, backing vocals
 Mickey Curry - drums
 Dave Taylor - bass
 Tommy Mandel - organ, keyboards
 Robbie King - organ
 Jim Vallance - piano, percussion, sequencer
 Dave Pickell - piano
 Ian Stanley - keyboards

References
http://eil.com/shop/moreinfo.asp?catalogid=194652

Bryan Adams albums
Albums produced by Bob Clearmountain
1988 compilation albums
A&M Records compilation albums